Vallée de la Marne is a sub-region of the Champagne wine region.
It is south of Champagne and Montagne de Reims, and north of Côte de Sézanne and Côte des Blancs.
The sub-region is located on the riverbanks of the Marne.
Its soils are more variable than in other Champagne sub-regions, and it contains only two Grands Crus villages: Ay and Tours-sur-Marne. Pinot Meunier is the main grape variety.

References 

Champagne (wine)
Wine regions of France